The 2014 International Tournament of Spain was the 18th edition of the International Tournament of Spain held in Fuengirola, Spain between 28–30 November as a women's friendly handball tournament organised by the Royal Spanish Handball Federation.

Results

Round robin

Final standing

References

External links
RFEBM Official Website
Table of the tournament

2014 in handball
2014 in Spanish sport
Fuengirola
Handball competitions in Spain
2014–15 in Spanish handball